The Wives of the Prophet is a 1926 American silent drama film directed by James A. Fitzgerald and starring Orville Caldwell, Alice Lake, and Violet Mersereau.

Plot
As described in a film magazine review, a religious sect in the Tennessee mountains expect the arrival of a prophet for whom five young women have been selected to be his wives. Howard, a young lawyer, accidentally witnesses their annual ritual, makes a sketch of Judith, one of the designated five young women, which is then reproduced as a tattoo on his chest. He is declared by the elders to be the Prophet and united to Judith and the other four women in a ritual in a huge cave. Of these, Alma has a sweetheart, Warner Richmond. Later, after avoiding moonshiners and their whiskey still and other adventures, he escapes to the outside world with Judith.

Cast

References

Bibliography
 Donald W. McCaffrey & Christopher P. Jacobs. Guide to the Silent Years of American Cinema. Greenwood Publishing, 1999.

External links
 

1926 films
1926 drama films
1920s English-language films
American silent feature films
Silent American drama films
American black-and-white films
1920s American films